is a Japanese football player.

Playing career
Hyodo was born in Gifu Prefecture on September 19, 2000. He joined J1 League club Nagoya Grampus from youth team in 2018. On August 22, he debuted against Sanfrecce Hiroshima in Emperor's Cup.

References

External links

2000 births
Living people
Association football people from Gifu Prefecture
Japanese footballers
J1 League players
Nagoya Grampus players
Association football forwards